Gerris pingreensis is a species of water strider in the family Gerridae. It is found in North America.

References

Articles created by Qbugbot
Insects described in 1925
Gerrini